Cheiracanthium rupestre is a spider species found in Eastern Europe.

See also 
 List of Eutichuridae species

References

External links 

rupestre
Spiders of Europe
Spiders described in 1879